James Harper may refer to:

 James Harper (publisher) (1795–1869), mayor of New York City 
 James Harper (actor) (born 1948), American actor
 James Harper (footballer) (born 1980), English footballer
 James Harper (congressman) (1780–1873), US congressman from Pennsylvania
 James C. Harper (1819–1890), US congressman from North Carolina
 James Harper (priest) (1859–1938), Dean of St Andrews, Dunkeld and Dunblane
 Jim Harper (footballer) (1884–1967), Australian rules footballer
 Jim Harper, a fictional character also known as Guardian, who appears in DC Comics media
 Jim Harper, a fictional character in the American television series The Newsroom
 Jimmy Harper, a fictional character in the musical Reefer Madness

See also
 James Harper McDonald (1900–1973), U.S. Navy diver
 James Harper Prowse (1913–1976), lawyer